The 2008 Japan Series was the 59th edition of Nippon Professional Baseball's championship series. The best-of-seven playoff between the respective champions of the Central League's and the Pacific League's Climax Series (postseason) began on Saturday, November 1, 2008, and went the full seven games. The deciding Game 7 took place on Sunday, November 9.

Climax Series

Summary

Game summaries

Game 1

Game 2

Game 3

Game 4

Takayuki Kishi tossed a 147-pitch, complete-game shutout, striking out 10 Giants in the process.  His opponent, Seth Greisinger, gave up 5 runs in as many innings, continuing his season-long struggles against the Lions.  Tempers flared in the 4th when Greisinger hit Seibu shortstop Hiroyuki Nakajima on the elbow with a pitch.  The two started shouting at each other, and the benches cleared.  No punches were thrown, but the next batter, Takeya Nakamura, crushed his first home run of the day to extend Seibu's lead to 3-0.  Nakamura would strike again in the 6th off Greisinger with another 2-run blast to end the scoring.

Game 5

Game 6

Kishi came through again with  innings of shutout ball in relief of Seibu starter Kazuyuki Hoashi after Hoashi got into trouble in the 4th.  The unsung hero of the Series, Hiroshi Hirao, crushed a 3-run home run to give the Lions a 3-0 lead off veteran lefty starter Hisanori Takahashi in the first.  Takahashi only lasted 2 innings, giving up 3 runs on 5 hits, walking 2 and striking out 2.

Game 7

The critical inning was the 8th.  Daisuke Ochi came in for the Giants to keep the Lions at bay, but Ochi got off to a bad start by hitting Kataoka.  Kataoka then stole second, and he was sacrificed to 3rd.  Hiroyuki Nakajima then hit a slow ground ball to 3rd, and Kataoka's speed allowed him to beat the throw home, tying the game up at 2.  Ochi then proceeded to walk the next two batters, then Hiroshi Hirao, on a 3-1 pitch, lined a breaking ball back up the middle to score Takeya Nakamura and give Seibu the lead.  Alex Graman closed out the Giants in the 9th to give the Lions their first Japan Series Championship since 2004.

See also
2008 Korean Series
2008 World Series

Japan Series
Saitama Seibu Lions
Yomiuri Giants
Japan Series